Kirk Stevens (born August 17, 1958) is a Canadian former professional snooker player.

Career
Stevens started playing young, achieving his first  aged just 12. He turned professional aged 20, and reached the semi-finals of the World Championship aged 21. In 1984 he achieved a maximum 147 break in a televised match against Jimmy White in the Benson & Hedges Masters, which remained the only such break ever made in the competition until Ding Junhui achieved the same feat in 2007. His stylish choice of attire (he often appeared at major tournaments wearing an all-white suit, as opposed to the traditional black suit with a white shirt) and his youthful 'popstar' good looks made him a ladies' favourite.

In 1985 he was wrongfully accused of taking stimulants before the final of the Dulux British Open Snooker Championship by South African Silvino Francisco. Stevens lost 9–12. Francisco was subsequently fined by the world governing body of snooker, the WPBSA, for the comments. The WPBSA, accepted that the accusation was false and it is on record that Kirk Stevens has never failed a drugs test in the history of his career. Shortly after the comments were made public, Stevens admitted to an addiction to cocaine in his personal life.

Although he underwent treatment, his career never really recovered. He dropped out of the top 16 in 1986/87, but continued to play on until 1992/93, before returning home to Canada and retiring from professional tournament play on the world circuit.

After returning to Canada Stevens won the Canadian Open Championship in 1997, 1998, 2000, 2002, and 2008. In 2011 he returned to the Crucible Theatre for the first time since 1988 to play in a "Snooker Legends" exhibition event.

On September 23, 2019, Jimmy White published an apology to Kirk Stevens on White's official Facebook page stating that in his autobiography Second Wind he misremembered a few stories as occurring with Kirk Stevens that in fact did not. These events were widely broadcast in the media and White wanted to make the apology public to prevent them from being repeated. White further stated that he did not intend his words to be interpreted as meaning that Kirk Stevens introduced him to crack cocaine or that Kirk Stevens ever played WPBSA snooker under the influence of drugs.

Performance and rankings timeline

Career finals

Ranking finals: 1

Non-ranking finals: 6 (3 titles)

Team finals: 4 (1 title)

Amateur finals: 6 (6 titles)

References

External links
World Snooker profile
Canadian Open history
Kirk Stevens Facebook Group

1958 births
Canadian snooker players
Living people
Sportspeople from Toronto